Decisive Battles of the American Civil War, Vol. 3 is a 1988 video game published by Strategic Studies Group.

Gameplay
Decisive Battles of the American Civil War, Vol. 3 is a game in which the period of the American Civil War from May, 1864 to April, 1865 is covered.

Reception
Joe Sherfy reviewed the game for Computer Gaming World, and stated that "DBACW Volume III is successful because it stresses realism without sacrificing playability. DBACW has brought it all together with a highly playable game which allows the player to determine which variables are most important. While I would recommend that the uninitiated start with Volume I or II of DBACW, the third volume is a must for anyone with a genuine interest in the war or who simply likes a tough challenge."

Reviews
ACE (Advanced Computer Entertainment) - May, 1989
Computer Gaming World - Oct, 1990

References

External links
Review in Compute!'s Gazette

1988 video games
American Civil War video games
Apple II games
Commodore 64 games
Computer wargames
DOS games
Multiplayer and single-player video games
Strategic Studies Group games
Video game sequels
Video games developed in Australia